Vidar Martinsen (born 11 March 1982 in Råde) is a Norwegian footballer currently playing for Råde IL after eight seasons in the Norwegian Fredrikstad.

Career statistics

References

External links
Guardian's Stats Centre

1981 births
Living people
People from Råde
Norwegian footballers
Moss FK players
Fredrikstad FK players
Eliteserien players
Norwegian First Division players
Association football defenders
Sportspeople from Viken (county)